James Johnson was an English railway engineer, and was Locomotive Superintendent of the Great North of Scotland Railway (GNSR) from 1890-1894. He was the son of Samuel Waite Johnson, of Midland Railway fame.

Locomotive designs
At the GNSR, he designed the locomotive classes listed below. Both classes survived into the ownership of the London and North Eastern Railway (LNER) in 1923.
 GNoSR class R (LNER Class G10) 0-4-4T
 GNoSR class S (LNER Class D41) 4-4-0

See also
Locomotives of the Great North of Scotland Railway

References

English railway mechanical engineers
Locomotive builders and designers
Year of birth missing
Year of death missing